Crestview High School may refer to:

 Crestview High School in Crestview, Florida
 Crestview High School in Ashland, Ohio
 Crestview High School in Columbiana, Ohio
 Crestview High School in Convoy, Ohio